Tyrique Lake (born 4 January 1999) is an Anguillan footballer who plays college soccer for Longwood University as a midfielder.

Early and personal life
Lake was born in Saint Thomas, U.S. Virgin Islands.

Career
Lake attended Fayetteville High School, where he was named to the All State, All Conference and All Star Soccer teams. He then attended Crowder College. After spending his freshman and sophomore years there, Lake transferred to Longwood University.

At the youth level, he played in the 2017 CONCACAF U-20 Championship qualifiers, scoring against the Cayman Islands. Lake made his senior international debut on 18 November 2018 in a 1-1 away draw with the Bahamas during CONCACAF Nations League qualifying.

Career statistics

International

References

External links
Tyrique Lake at Crowder College Roughriders Official Website
Tyrique Lake at Longwood University Lancers Official Website

Living people
1999 births
Anguillan footballers
Anguilla international footballers
Anguilla under-20 international footballers
Association football midfielders
Junior college men's soccer players in the United States
Longwood Lancers men's soccer players
Anguillan expatriate footballers
Anguillan expatriate sportspeople in the United States
Expatriate soccer players in the United States
People from Saint Thomas, U.S. Virgin Islands